Modern fantasy may refer to:

 Fantasy written in the late modern period
 Contemporary fantasy, works of fantasy that are set in the time period they are written